Hallangen is a lake on rv 21 in Setskog, Aurskog-Høland, a municipality of Akershus. Hallangen lies at a height of 191 m above sea level. The lake is a remnant of the timber floating between  Langebruslora and down to Gåsefjorden. From 2004, many new cabins have been built around Hallangen and eastwards. Flyktningeruta, which was a flight route during World War II passes through Hallangen. Flyktningeruta was marked in 1995.

Aurskog-Høland
Lakes of Viken (county)